Strafkompanie ("Punitive Unit") is the German word for the penal work division in the Nazi concentration camps.

SK was the abbreviation used in the concentration camps for the notorious Strafkompanies. These penal divisions were yet another hardship that could be forced on the already exhausted inmates of the camps. The prisoners of the Strafkompanie were given hard work, e.g., in the quarries, where most "workers" died. In the SK they worked longer hours than other inmates, had shorter breaks, less food, more brutal treatment, and they lived isolated in separate barracks.

The Strafkompanie consisted of all kinds of prisoners: criminals, Jews, Russian soldiers, political prisoners, priests, Jehovah's Witnesses, homosexuals, Roma Gypsies. The criteria for the selection to the penal division were arbitrary.

See also
Nazi concentration camp badges

References
Eugen Kogon:The Theory and Practice of Hell: The German Concentration Camps and the System Behind Them. Berkley Trade (July 1, 1998). . Chapter 8.
 Wolfgang Sofsky & William Templer: The Order of Terror: The Concentration Camp, Princeton University Press,1999,   page 218

Nazi concentration camps